Francolinus is a genus of birds in the francolin group of the tribe Gallini in the pheasant family.

Species
Its three species range from western Asia and central Asia through to southern Asia and south-eastern Asia. The species are:

References

Further reading

 
Bird genera